Tanika Sarkar is a historian of modern India based at the Jawaharlal Nehru University. Sarkar's work focuses on the intersections of religion, gender, and politics in both colonial and postcolonial South Asia, in particular on women and the Hindu Right.

Life and career 
Tanikar Sarkar was born to Amal Bhattacharya, professor of English at Presidency College, and Sukumari Bhattacharya, eminent Sanskritist and scholar on early Indian culture. She is married to fellow historian, Sumit Sarkar.

Sarkar earned a B.A. in History from the Presidency College, University of Calcutta in 1972. She also earned a degree in Modern History from the University of Calcutta in 1974. She received her PhD from the University of Delhi in 1981.

She is a professor of history at the Jawaharlal Nehru University, New Delhi. 
She has also taught at the St. Stephen's College, and the Indraprastha College, Delhi University. She has also taught modern Indian History at the University of Chicago.

Publications
Tanika Sarkar has published the following Monographs:
 Bengal 1928-1934: The Politics of Protest, (Oxford University Press India, 1987), .
 Words to Win: A Modern Autobiography (Kali for Women, 1999).
 Khaki Shorts and Saffron Flags: A Critique of the Hindu Right (coauthored with Tapan Basu, Pradip Datta, Sumit Sarkar and Sambuddha Sen; Orient Longman 1993), .
 Women and the Hindu Right (edited jointly with Urvashi Butalia, 1995), .
 Women and Right-Wing Movement: Indian Experiences (edited jointly with Urvashi Butalia, 1998), .
 Hindu Wife, Hindu Nation: Community, Religion, Cultural Nationalism (Hurst, 2001), .
 Women and Social Reform in Modern India: A Reader (two volumes, edited jointly with Sumit Sarkar, 2008), 
 Rebels, Wives, Saints: Designing Selves and Nations in Colonial Times (University of Chicago Press, 2009), .
 Caste in Modern India: A Reader (two volumes, edited jointly with Sumit Sarkar, Permanent Black, 2013), ASIN B00O122Q6E.
 Words to Win: The Making of a Modern Autobiography (2014), .
 Calcutta: The Stormy Decades (2015) edited with Sekhar Bandyopadhyay

Recognitions
In 2004, she has received the Rabindra Puraskar from the Bangla Academy, the highest literary award given in West Bengal.  It was reported that she intended to return it in protest over the police firing in Nandigram in March 2007.

References

External links
 An interview with Tanika Sarkar, Permanent Black
 "Delhi Historians Group's Publication Communalization of Education: The History Textbooks Controversy, A report in 2002, New Delhi: Jawaharlal Nehru University, India

Presidency University, Kolkata alumni
Bengali historians
Historians of South Asia
20th-century Indian historians
Indian women historians
Living people
University of Calcutta alumni
Academic staff of Delhi University
Academic staff of Jawaharlal Nehru University
University of Chicago faculty
Writers about Hindu nationalism
Year of birth missing (living people)
Indian women political writers
20th-century Indian women scientists
20th-century Indian scientists
Indian women science writers
Indian social sciences writers
21st-century Indian women writers
21st-century Indian non-fiction writers
21st-century Indian women scientists
21st-century Indian scientists
20th-century women writers